The 1988 Pau Grand Prix was a Formula 3000 motor race held on 23 May 1988 at the Pau circuit, in Pau, Pyrénées-Atlantiques, France. The race was run as part of the 1988 International Formula 3000 Championship.

Entry list

Classification

Qualifying

Race

References

Pau Grand Prix
1988 in French motorsport